Marienkirche (St. Mary's Church) is a church in Dortmund, North Rhine-Westphalia state, Germany, located in the inner city. Since the Reformation, it has been a Lutheran parish church of St. Marien. The church was destroyed in World War II, but rebuilt. It also serves as a concert venue for sacred music.

The church was built on the Hellweg, opposite of the Reinoldikirche, for the town's council and jurisdiction.

History 

The church was built on the Hellweg, a main Medieval road connecting the free imperial town Dortmund with others. It was erected between 1170 and 1200 in Romanesque style to serve the town's council and jurisdiction. It is the oldest extant church in Dortmund's inner city. Around 1350, a choir in Gothic architecture was built. It served as a model for the Reinoldikirche, which was built opposite of the road.

The central panel of the Berswordt-Altar dating from 1397 depicts the Swoon of the Virgin, an imagery which gradually disappeared from paintings of the Crucifixion after Molanus and other theologians of the Counter-Reformation condemned its use. The Marienaltar now contains only fragments of von Soest's original masterpiece. In 1720 a new reredos was installed, and workmen took hammers and saws to the paintings to make them fit into the new frames, losing over half of the large central panel and a quarter of each of the two side panels.<ref>Charles, Victoria and Carl, Klaus (2014). [https://books.google.com/books?id=esKjAwAAQBAJ&pg=PA101 Gothic Art], p. 101. Parkstone International. </ref>

Since the Reformation, it has been a Lutheran parish church of St. Marien. The church was almost completely destroyed by bombs in World War II. However, both the Marienaltar and the Berswordtaltar had been evacuated to the Cappenberg Castle at the outset of the war and thus survived. The church was rebuilt, beginning right after the war and completed in 1959. The glass windows were restored in subdued colours after designs of Johannes Schreiter, completed in 1972. The church serves as a concert venue for sacred music.

 Literature 

 Klaus Lange: Capella Regis. Zum Bauprogramm der Dortmunder Marienkirche. in: Beiträge zur Geschichte Dortmunds und der Grafschaft Mark. 83/84, 1992/1993
 Konrad Lorenz: Die Ev. St. Marienkirche zu Dortmund. Mariengemeinde, Dortmund 1981
 Albert Ludorff: Die Bau- und Kunstdenkmäler des Kreises Dortmund-Stadt. Münster 1894.
 Gustav Luntowski: Günther Högl, Thomas Schilp, Norbert Reimann, Geschichte der Stadt Dortmund., Stadtarchiv Dortmund, Dortmund (Harenberg) 1994, 
 Götz J. Pfeiffer: Die Malerei am Niederrhein und in Westfalen um 1400. Der Meister des Berswordt-Retabels und der Stilwandel der Zeit, Petersberg, 2009, Dissertation. Berlin, 2005
 Götz J. Pfeiffer: "... noch vorzüglicher wie die zwei weiblichen Heiligen ...". Werke vom Meister des Berswordt-Retabels mit dem Wildunger Retabel im Vergleich. In: Geschichtsblätter für Waldeck, 96, 2008, p. 10–31
 Wolfgang Rinke: Dortmunder Kirchen des Mittelalters, St. Reinoldi, St. Marien, St. Johannes Bapt. Propstei, St. Petri. Dortmund 1991, 
 Thomas Schilp und Barbara Welzel (Hg.): Die Marienkirche in Dortmund.'' Bielefeld (Verlag für Regionalgeschichte) 2012,

References

External links 

  
 Foundation St. Marien 

Protestant churches in Dortmund
Dortmund Marienkirche
Dortmund Marienkirche
Dortmund Marienkirche
Dortmund Marienkirche